Thomas Priestley is the name of:

Tommy Priestley, (1911-1985), Irish footballer
Tom Priestley, English film editor